Thomas Ferguson McCormick (January 2, 1926 – February 10, 2022) was an American politician.

McCormick was born in New York City, Brooklyn, New York. He went to Mepham High School in Bellmore, Nassau County. McCormick served in the United States Navy from 1944 to 1947. He went to Yale University and then graduated from Brown University. He worked in the insurance and electric typewriters businesses. McCormick lived with his wife in New Canaan, Connecticut, and then moved to New London, New Hampshire, in 1985. He was elected to the New Hampshire House of Representatives in 2002 as a Republican, and lost his re-election bid in 2004. He died on February 10, 2022, at the age of 96 at his home in New London, New Hampshire.

References

1926 births
2022 deaths
Members of the New Hampshire House of Representatives
People from New Canaan, Connecticut
People from New London, New Hampshire
Politicians from Brooklyn
Businesspeople from New York City
Businesspeople from Vermont
Military personnel from New York City
Yale University
Brown University alumni